Pirate Capital LLC is a Norwalk, Connecticut based investment adviser founded in 2002 by Thomas R. Hudson Jr.  The firm employs shareholder activism to push for structural changes in target companies. The firm's assets fell to $375 million as of September, 2007 from $1.8 billion a year earlier.

Investment strategy
Pirate Capital LLC is the general partner entity to 4 funds (listed below). All 4 funds employ the same approach to investing, though the activist funds tend to be significantly more concentrated, and primarily consist of equity instruments in companies that are targeted for activism.

The fund purchases stakes in underperforming companies and then pushes for managerial action. The company's motto is: "Surrender the Booty!"

Tom Hudson, 50, who founded Pirate in 2002, is known for acquiring stakes in companies and pushing management to make changes to boost their stock prices.  Thomas Hudson Jr. fired all twelve employees at Doubloon Capital for no apparent reason. The Fund has ceased operations and failed to be productive. Hudson currently resides in New Canaan, Connecticut.

Noted instruments 

Pirate is known to be associated with the following entities (with approximate assets under control, pulled from various open sources - September, 2007):

Jolly Roger Offshore Fund LTD - $199m
Jolly Roger Fund LP - $79m
Jolly Roger Activist Fund Onshore - $39m
Jolly Roger Activist Fund Offshore - $58m
Total Assets Under Management as of August 1, 2008 - $1

Key personnel 
 Thomas R. Hudson, Jr, founder and sole managing partner; formerly managed a portfolio of distressed bank debt at Goldman Sachs. Mr Hudson was fired from Goldman Sachs in 1999 and from Amroc Investments in 2001.

References 

Financial services companies established in 2002
Hedge fund firms in Connecticut
Companies based in Norwalk, Connecticut